William II of Burgundy (c.1085–1125), known as the German, was a French nobleman.

Life
William was the only son of Reginald II, Count of Burgundy and nephew to pope Calixtus II via his father, whilst his mother countess Régine of Oltingen was daughter of Conon, count of Oltingen, Bale in Swiss-Germany.

On Reginald's death in 1095 during the First Crusade aged 41, he succeeded him jointly with his uncle Stephen as count of Burgundy and count of Mâcon.  William II died in 1125, the victim of a plot against him by his barons.  He married Agnes the daughter of Berthold II of Zahringen and had William III who was assassinated in infancy in 1127 and Stephen I's son Renaud was made count.

Counts of Burgundy
1080s births
1125 deaths